Anatoli Yevgenyevich Kozhemyakin (24 February 1953 – 13 October 1974) was a Soviet football player. He died in a freak accident: he was stuck in an elevator, but was able to open the elevator doors, as he tried to climb out, the elevator started moving again and crushed him to death.

Honours
 Soviet Top League bronze: 1973.
 Soviet Top League second-best scorer: 1973.
 UEFA Cup Winners' Cup finalist: 1972.
 Top 33 players year-end list: 1973.

International career
Kozhemyakin made his debut for USSR on 29 March 1972 (aged 19) in a friendly against Bulgaria. He played in a 1974 FIFA World Cup qualifier against Chile. USSR team did not go to the return game against Chile in protest against the Augusto Pinochet regime.

References

1953 births
1974 deaths
Soviet footballers
Soviet Union international footballers
Soviet Top League players
FC Dynamo Moscow players
Russian footballers
Footballers from Moscow
Accidental deaths in the Soviet Union

Association football forwards
Elevator accidents